Mehdi Bourabia (born 7 August 1991) is a professional footballer who plays as a midfielder for Serie A club Spezia. Born in France, he represents the Morocco national team.

Club career
Bourabia was born in Dijon, Côte-d'Or. He started his career with Grenoble Foot 38 and made his professional debut for the club on 7 November 2009 in a Ligue 1 game against Monaco.

In June 2015, Bourabia signed a two-year contract with Cherno More Varna. On 12 August, he scored the only goal in a 1–0 victory over Ludogorets Razgrad in the Bulgarian Supercup.

On 11 January 2016, Bourabia signed with Levski Sofia on a three-year deal. On 22 June 2017, he was sold to Turkish club Konyaspor for a fee around 500 000 €.

On 17 July 2018, Bourabia signed with Sassuolo for a fee around €2 million.

On 30 August 2021, Bourabia joined Spezia on a season-long loan with an obligation to buy.

International career
Bourabia was born in France and is of Moroccan descent. He debuted for the Morocco national football team in a 2–2 2019 Africa Cup of Nations qualification draw  against Comoros on 16 October 2018.

Career statistics

Club

Honours
Cherno More
Bulgarian Supercup: 2015

Konyaspor
Turkish Super Cup: 2017

References

External links
 
 Profile at Foot-National

1991 births
Living people
Sportspeople from Dijon
Citizens of Morocco through descent
Association football midfielders
Moroccan footballers
French footballers
Morocco international footballers
2019 Africa Cup of Nations players
French sportspeople of Moroccan descent
Ligue 1 players
Ligue 2 players
Championnat National 2 players
First Professional Football League (Bulgaria) players
Süper Lig players
Serie A players
Grenoble Foot 38 players
PFC Lokomotiv Plovdiv players
PFC Cherno More Varna players
PFC Levski Sofia players
Konyaspor footballers
U.S. Sassuolo Calcio players
Spezia Calcio players
French expatriate footballers
French expatriate sportspeople in Bulgaria
Expatriate footballers in Bulgaria
French expatriate sportspeople in Turkey
Expatriate footballers in Turkey
Footballers from Bourgogne-Franche-Comté
Moroccan expatriate footballers
Moroccan expatriate sportspeople in Italy
French expatriate sportspeople in Italy
Moroccan expatriate sportspeople in Bulgaria
Moroccan expatriate sportspeople in Turkey
Expatriate footballers in Italy